State Route 232 (SR 232) is a  east–west state highway located in the east-central part of the U.S. state of Georgia. It travels through west-central Columbia County and northeastern Richmond County. At its western end, it is a fairly rural highway, but its eastern end is an urban corridor of the Augusta metropolitan area. It connects Appling with Evans, Martinez, and Augusta.

Route description
SR 232 begins at an intersection with US 221/SR 47 (Appling–Harlem Highway) just south of Appling, in west-central Columbia County. The highway travels to the east-southeast to intersect with Louisville Road. Just over  later, it crosses over Little Kiokee Creek. Just to the east-southeast of the intersection with William Few Parkway – a highway that connects nearby Grovetown to areas northwest of Evans – is the main entrance to Patriots Park. Immediately past the park, SR 232 passes Bartram Trail Golf Course. On the eastern edge of the course is a bridge over Euchee Creek. To the east is a strategic intersection: the western terminus of Hereford Farm Road (which leads to northwestern parts of Evans) to the north and the northern terminus of SR 388 (Lewiston Road; which leads to Grovetown) to the south. Later on is a bridge over Steiner Creek. At the intersection with South Old Belair Road, the highway begins to skirt along the edge of the city limits of Evans. At the bridge over Crawford Creek, SR 232 enters Evans proper. Farther to the east, it intersects SR 383 (South Belair Road / North Belair Road). Starting at this intersection, SR 232 travels along the Evans–Martinez line. At the eastern end of that section, it intersects SR 104 (Washington Road). At this intersection, they begin a brief concurrency and enter Martinez proper. At the intersection with the southern terminus of Old Evans Road, SR 232 turns south-southeasterly onto Bobby Jones Expressway. It enters Richmond County and the city limits of Augusta. Just after the county line, it has an interchange with Scott Nixon Memorial Drive, and then immediately meets its eastern terminus at an interchange with Interstate 20 (I-20; Carl Sanders Highway). The roadway continues as the western end of I-520, which is also known as Bobby Jones Expressway.

The only part of SR 232 that is included as part of the National Highway System, a system of routes determined to be the most important for the nation's economy, mobility and defense, is the section east of the western intersection with SR 104.

History

SR 232 was established between July and October 1939 along an alignment from its western terminus to its western intersection with SR 104, however it was designated as part of SR 150.

In 1945, this section was redesignated as SR 232.

In 1950, the road was paved from its western terminus to approximately  farther to the east.

In 1953, the entire original section was paved.

By 1966, the rest of the road's length was paved, with a proposal to extend it along the current route of I-520, at least as far as US 25/SR 121.

Major intersections

See also
 
 
 Central Savannah River Area

References

External links

 Georgia Roads (Routes 221 - 240)

232
Transportation in Columbia County, Georgia
Transportation in Richmond County, Georgia
Transportation in Augusta, Georgia